John Bamber may refer to:

Jack Bamber (1895–1973), English footballer
John Bamber (footballer, born 1912) (1912–2000), English footballer